The suffix -one is used in organic chemistry to form names of organic compounds containing the -C(=O)- group: see ketone. Sometimes a number between hyphens is inserted before it to state which atom the =O atom is attached to. This suffix was extracted from the word acetone. The final "-e" disappears if it is followed by another suffix that starts with a vowel.

References 

one
English suffixes